Lehmber Hussainpuri (pronounced ; born 17 July 1977) is an Indian Bhangra singer.

Life 
Lehmber Hussainpuri was born on 17 July 1977 in his village Hussainpur. He now resides in Deol Nagar Jalandhar City. On May 31, 2021, Lehmber was accused of assaulting his wife and kids. An organisation called the Punjab Women's Commission helped his family in resolving the issue.

Career 
Lehmber Hussainpuri and Kaka Bhainiawala both have similar vocals and were introduced by Music Pearls Ludhiana. From 2008 to 2010, songs such as Mera Mahi Tu Pateya, featured on Jeeti's Serious Duets, Gulaab featured on DJ H's Reloaded, and Dil Lagee featured on North American group Dhol Beat International's Absolut Bhangra 4, continued to top charts.

On 28 April 2010, it was announced that MovieBox Records had acquired Serious Records.

July 2010 passed by without any further announcement by MovieBox regarding the delay or any new release date. Hussainpuri, after a long break from the limelight, gave insight into his upcoming projects in an interview. He said, "Besides my solo album, I have a devotional album also coming out this year." He also stated that for his next solo project he was trying his hand singing qawwalis and songs which address a social cause, quite a different approach to his usual fast-beat party tunes. Lastly, he mentioned that he was heading towards Bollywood. He said, "Akshay Kumar has expressed his desire to work with me and we shall come out together with a project soon."

Hussainpuri also featured on the soundtrack of the Hindi film Mausam on the song "Mallo Malli" with Hard Kaur.

In May 2011, after a longer than anticipated break, Hussainpuri returned to the UK in true "Lehmber-style" - by releasing a major dance-floor hit. The smash hit "Matha Tekhiya" was featured on Bups Saggu's debut album Redefined and instantly became a hit.

On 21 October 2011, after a 5-year hiatus since his last solo effort Chalakiyan, Hussainpuri released his new album Folk Attack 2 on Serious Records. It featured production from Hussainpuri's regular collaborators Jeeti and Kam Frantic as well as Bhinda Aujla, Sukhi Chand, and Panjabi By Nature. The first single from the album, "Jatt Pagal Karte" (produced by Jeeti) was released 14 October 2011 and was followed by "Pulli Phirdi" (produced by Kam Frantic) on 4 November 2011.

In an interview, Hussainpuri mentioned how he has done a total of 6 songs with Bollywood producer Pritam, a few songs with other Bollywood producers, and 21 total songs for Punjabi Movie Industry, in order to expand his market.

As part of BBC Asian Network's Bhangra Britain season (April 2014) to find the greatest Bhangra anthem, Hussainpuri's classic "Das Ja" was selected as Third Best UK Bhangra Song of All-Time. A panel of experts shortlisted 50 songs from the 1970s onwards, celebrating four decades of British Bhangra sounds.

After a summer 2014 chart-topper, "Make It Clap" with Jags Klimax, Hussainpuri released a follow-up to one of the biggest UK bhangra tracks of all time, "Das Ja". "Das Ja 2", released 12 years after the original was featured on DJ Sanj's album Hype, once again had Lehmber at the helm but this time around was produced by roadshow DJs, DNA. In 2020 he made a comeback with Manke (2).

Discography

Official albums

Singles

Compilations, religious albums, and foreign releases

Film soundtracks

References

1977 births
Living people
Bhangra (music) musicians
Indian Sikhs
Musicians from Punjab, India
Punjabi singers
Indian male singers
Punjabi-language singers
Punjabi people
Musicians from Amritsar
People from Amritsar district